Conrad Williams (born 20 March 1982) is a British track and field sprinter who competes in the 400 metres and 4×400 m relay. He holds a personal best of 45.02 seconds for the individual event.

The majority of his success has come in relay events, where he has won eight senior international medals, including the gold medal for both England at the 2014 Commonwealth Games, and for Great Britain at the 2014 European Athletics Championships.

At the 2012 Summer Olympics, although he did not advance beyond the semi-finals in the 400 m, he was part of the British team that came fourth in the men's 4 x 400 m.

He is a resident in Hither Green, Lewisham.

Personal bests

References

External links

1982 births
Living people
British male sprinters
English male sprinters
Black British sportspeople
Olympic athletes of Great Britain
Athletes (track and field) at the 2012 Summer Olympics
World Athletics Championships medalists
European Athletics Championships medalists
Commonwealth Games gold medallists for England
Commonwealth Games bronze medallists for England
Commonwealth Games medallists in athletics
Athletes (track and field) at the 2010 Commonwealth Games
Athletes (track and field) at the 2014 Commonwealth Games
Sportspeople from Kingston, Jamaica
English people of Jamaican descent
World Athletics Indoor Championships medalists
Medallists at the 2010 Commonwealth Games
Medallists at the 2014 Commonwealth Games